Jack Cooper (12 August 1911 – 7 February 1996) was a former Australian rules footballer who played with Carlton in the Victorian Football League (VFL). He later played for Brunswick in the Victorian Football Association (VFA).

Notes

External links 

Jack Cooper's profile at Blueseum

1911 births
1996 deaths
Carlton Football Club players
Australian rules footballers from Victoria (Australia)
Brunswick Football Club players